Cleone (formerly Kanuck) is a census-designated place in Mendocino County, California, United States. It most likely takes its name from Kelio, a division or village of the Pomo people. The population was 622 at the 2020 census.

The Kanuck post office opened in 1883, changed its name to Cleone in 1883, and closed in 1908. 
In 1883, a sawmill about of a mile and a half east of the village of Cleone was constructed. Wood products were shipped from a wharf at the place. Railroad cars ran down by gravity from the hill to the chute and were returned by horses.

The main entrance to MacKerricher State Park is in Cleone.

Geography

Demographics

The 2010 United States Census reported that Cleone had a population of 618. The racial makeup of Cleone was 518 (83.8%) White, 1 (0.2%) African American, 3 (0.5%) Native American, 3 (0.5%) Asian, 0 (0.0%) Pacific Islander, 79 (12.8%) from other races, and 14 (2.3%) from two or more races. Hispanic or Latino of any race were 124 persons (20.1%).

The Census reported that 618 people (100% of the population) lived in households, 0 (0%) lived in non-institutionalized group quarters, and 0 (0%) were institutionalized.

There were 285 households, out of which 66 (23.2%) had children under the age of 18 living in them, 126 (44.2%) were opposite-sex married couples living together, 30 (10.5%) had a female householder with no husband present, 15 (5.3%) had a male householder with no wife present.  There were 19 (6.7%) unmarried opposite-sex partnerships, and 1 (0.4%) same-sex married couples or partnerships. 103 households (36.1%) were made up of individuals, and 40 (14.0%) had someone living alone who was 65 years of age or older. The average household size was 2.17.  There were 171 families (60.0% of all households); the average family size was 2.70.

The population was spread out, with 107 people (17.3%) under the age of 18, 39 people (6.3%) aged 18 to 24, 127 people (20.6%) aged 25 to 44, 214 people (34.6%) aged 45 to 64, and 131 people (21.2%) who were 65 years of age or older.  The median age was 49.6 years. For every 100 females, there were 104.0 males.  For every 100 females age 18 and over, there were 95.8 males.

The homeowner vacancy rate was 2.8%; the rental vacancy rate was 11.6%.  443 people (71.7% of the population) lived in owner-occupied housing units and 175 people (28.3%) lived in rental housing units.

Politics

References

Census-designated places in Mendocino County, California
Census-designated places in California
Populated coastal places in California